Platynosomum is a genus of flatworms belonging to the family Dicrocoeliidae.

The genus has cosmopolitan distribution.

Species:

Platynosomum acuminatum 
Platynosomum alectoris 
Platynosomum allentoshi 
Platynosomum amazonensis 
Platynosomum andersoni 
Platynosomum angrense 
Platynosomum arietis 
Platynosomum beltrani 
Platynosomum burrman 
Platynosomum butei 
Platynosomum capranum 
Platynosomum clathratum 
Platynosomum costaricense 
Platynosomum fallax 
Platynosomum fastosum 
Platynosomum furnarii 
Platynosomum illiciens 
Platynosomum kirgisensis 
Platynosomum marmoseti 
Platynosomum marquesi 
Platynosomum mazzai 
Platynosomum muris 
Platynosomum passeris 
Platynosomum philippinorum 
Platynosomum planicipitis 
Platynosomum pyrrhocoraxi 
Platynosomum rutshurensis 
Platynosomum semifuscum 
Platynosomum ventroplicatum 
Platynosomum verschureni

References

Platyhelminthes